Daulatunnesa Khatun ( 1918-August 4, 1997)  is a Bangladesh Nationalist Party politician and the former Member of the Bangladesh Parliament in a women's reserved seat.

Career
Khatun was elected to parliament from women's reserved seat as a Bangladesh Nationalist Party candidate in 1979.

References

Bangladesh Nationalist Party politicians
1918 births
1997 deaths
2nd Jatiya Sangsad members
Women members of the Jatiya Sangsad
20th-century Bangladeshi women politicians